Minnesota State Highway 18 (MN 18) is a  highway in east-central Minnesota, which runs from its intersection with State Highway 25 in Brainerd and continues east to its eastern terminus at its intersection with State Highway 23 in Finlayson Township near Askov and Sandstone.  The eastern terminus of Highway 18 is less than 1/2 mile west of an interchange with Interstate Highway 35 along Highway 23.

For part of its route (5 miles), Highway 18 runs concurrent with U.S. Highway 169 in Crow Wing and Aitkin counties around the northwest side of Mille Lacs Lake.

Route description
State Highway 18 serves as an east–west route between Brainerd, Garrison, Mille Lacs Lake, and Finlayson in east-central Minnesota.  The route passes around the north end of Mille Lacs Lake, which is a popular fishing and recreational destination in Minnesota.

The section of Highway 18 from Brainerd to Garrison  is officially designated the POW / MIA Memorial Highway.  A section of U.S. Highway 169 in Minnesota also takes on this same memorial name designation.

Highway 18 passes through the Wealthwood State Forest in Aitkin County.

Banning State Park is located east of the junction of Highways 18 and 23; opposite the I-35 freeway near Askov and Sandstone.

History
The section of State Highway 18 between Brainerd and U.S. 169 at Garrison was authorized on November 2, 1920.  The remainder of the route was authorized in 1933 and 1963.

From 1933 until the mid-1950s, the eastern terminus of Highway 18 was at the present day junction of State Highway 27 and State Highway 47 (then State Highway 56) at Isle.

Before 1963, the present day section of Highway 18 between State Highway 47 and State Highway 65 was originally numbered as State Highway 27; and the present day section of Highway 18 between State Highway 65 and State Highway 23 (near Sandstone) was originally numbered as State Highway 66 (essentially east of Mille Lacs Lake).

By 1940, the only paved section of Highway 18 was between Brainerd and Garrison. The last unpaved section of Highway 18 was east of State Highway 47 to State Highway 65, paved in the late 1960s.

At one time, Highway 18 had continued farther west of State Highway 25 in Brainerd.  This section was turned back to the city of Brainerd maintenance in 2001 after completion of the nearby Highway 371 Brainerd bypass.

Major intersections

References

018
Transportation in Crow Wing County, Minnesota
Transportation in Aitkin County, Minnesota
Transportation in Mille Lacs County, Minnesota
Transportation in Pine County, Minnesota